Eden Alene (born 7 May 2000) is an Israeli singer. Having won the seventh season of the singing competition HaKokhav HaBa, she had been set to represent Israel in the Eurovision Song Contest 2020, with her song "Feker Libi", planned to be held in Rotterdam, Netherlands. After the cancellation of the 2020 contest due to the COVID-19 pandemic, she was internally chosen to represent Israel in the Eurovision Song Contest 2021, this time with "Set Me Free".

Early life 
Alene was born in the neighborhood of Katamon in Jerusalem, to Ethiopian-Jewish parents who immigrated separately to Israel during the aliyah from Ethiopia. When she was two years old her parents divorced. Since then, she has not been in contact with her father.

Alene attended religious Jewish elementary school and middle school, although she then attended the secular Jewish high school of the Hebrew University Secondary School and majored in theatre.

She was enlisted in October 2018 as a soldier in to the Israel Defense Forces (IDF), and served in the military band of the Education and Youth Corps. She received an honorable discharge in October 2020.

She was in a relationship with her Israeli boyfriend, Yonatan Gabay. The two broke up in February 2022.

As of 2022, Alene had stopped working in the music industry, and currently works as a hostess in a restaurant in Tel Aviv.

Career 
In October 2017, Alene was a contestant in the third season of the singing competition The X Factor Israel. She auditioned with the song "Stone Cold" by Demi Lovato. In January 2018, she won the season finale.

In April 2018, she performed a song by Arkadi Duchin at the torch-lighting ceremony that opened the celebrations of the 70th anniversary of the establishment of the State of Israel. In December 2018, she released her debut single "Better". In 2019, she took part in an Israeli production of the musical Little Shop of Horrors.

In February 2019, ahead of the Eurovision Song Contest 2019 held in Tel Aviv, Alene released a cover of the song "Save Your Kisses for Me" by Brotherhood of Man, which won the Eurovision Song Contest 1976. In March 2019, she released her second single, "When It Comes to You", which was produced by American producer Julian Bunetta.

Eurovision Song Contest
In 2019, she participated in the seventh season of the Israeli singing competition Rising Star (HaKokhav HaBa), achieving first place on 4 February 2020. As the winner, she was supposed to represent Israel in the Eurovision Song Contest 2020 to be held in Rotterdam, Netherlands. The four finalist songs for her were "Savior in the Sound", "Roots", "Rakata" and "Feker Libi". Eventually the song "Feker Libi" was picked, which contains four languages English, Arabic, Hebrew and Amharic. However, on 18 March 2020, the event was cancelled due to the COVID-19 pandemic.
On 22 March 2020, it was announced that she had been internally chosen to represent Israel in the Eurovision Song Contest 2021. In January 2021, her three songs one of which is the candidate for the final are "Ue La La", "La La Love" and "Set Me Free". Eventually, on 25 January 2021, the song "Set Me Free" was picked.

On 18 May 2021, she performed 12th during the first semi-final, following Belgium and preceding Romania. She qualified to the final on 22 May. In addition to that, she broke the all-time record for the highest note in Eurovision history, hitting a B6 whistle note during the first semi-final of Eurovision 2021. In the final, she scored 93 points, finishing 17th out of 26.

Discography

Extended plays

Singles

Notes

References 

2000 births
Living people
21st-century Israeli singers
Israeli people of Ethiopian-Jewish descent
Eurovision Song Contest entrants of 2020
Eurovision Song Contest entrants of 2021
Eurovision Song Contest entrants for Israel
The X Factor winners
Musicians from Jerusalem
People from Kiryat Gat
Amharic-language singers